Chirawa is a municipal town and tehsil in Jhunjhunu district of Shekhawati region in Rajasthan state of India.

See also 
 Jhunjhunu district

References

Cities and towns in Jhunjhunu district